This is a list of finalists for the 2005 Archibald Prize for portraiture (listed is Artist – Title).
Rick Amor – Shane Maloney (Image)
Bruce Armstrong – Self portrait (Image)
Martin Ball – John Pule
John Beard – Hilarie Mais
Jason Benjamin – Staring down the past – (Bill Hunter) (Image) (Winner of the Packing Room Prize)
Annette Bezor – Still posing after all this time (a self portrait)
Jon Campbell – Double Darren
Adam Chang – Gene & the doorway
Peter Churcher – Portrait of Jeffrey Smart
Esther Erlich – Lindy Wills
James Guppy – Chagrin
Robert Hannaford – Bob Brown
Nicholas Harding – Bob's daily swim – (Robert Dickerson) (Image)  (Winner of the People's Choice Award)
Bill Hay – Allan Mitelman
Terrence Hunter Chapter Six – Self portrait
Paul Jackson – Gretel Killeen
Raymond Kenyon – The architect at home – (Glenn Murcutt)
Jasper Knight – Richard Gill
Kerrie Lester – Rebel
Mathew Lynn – Wendy drawing – (Wendy Sharpe)
Lewis Miller – My dentist – Dr Jonathan Hartley
Ian North – Daniel Thomas at home, Northern Tasmania
John Olsen – Self portrait Janus faced (Winner of the Archibald Prize)
Rodney Pople – Kerrie Lester – after Goya
Ben Quilty – Beryl – (Beryl Whiteley, mother of Brett Whiteley)
Abdul Karim – Rahimi John McDonald
David Ralph – Imagination – Adam and Harvie – (Adam Elliot was the creator of Harvie Krumpet)
Paul Ryan – Archibald, Archibald, wherefore art thou Archibald?
Jenny Sages – Gloria Tamere Petyarre
Garry Shead – All the World's a Stage – Simon Phillips
Jiawei Shen – John So, The Lord Mayor of Melbourne
Avril Thomas – The Minister from down under –  (Hon. Alexander Downer M.P.)
Deborah Trusson – Naked
John R. Walker – Self portrait
Xu Wang – Jiawei Shen
Michael Zavros – Portrait of Alex Dimitriades

See also 
Previous year: List of Archibald Prize 2004 finalists
Next year: List of Archibald Prize 2006 finalists
List of Archibald Prize winners

References

External links 
Archibald Prize 2005 finalists official website

2005
Archibald
Archibald Prize 2005
Archibald Prize 2005
2005 in art
Arch
Archibald